Hildegard Appeltauer (born 4 July 1927) was an Austrian figure skater. She competed in the ladies' singles event at the 1948 Winter Olympics.

References

External links

1927 births
Possibly living people
Austrian female single skaters
Olympic figure skaters of Austria
Figure skaters at the 1948 Winter Olympics
Place of birth missing (living people)